Mass media in Italy includes a variety of online, print, and broadcast formats, such as radio, television, newspapers, and magazines.

History
The governmental Ministry of Communications formed in 1924. "The legalization of local, independent broadcasting stations in 1976 radically changed the media landscape."

Magazines

Newspapers

Among the most widely read national newspapers in Italy are Corriere della Sera, Corriere dello Sport – Stadio, La Gazzetta dello Sport, Il Giorno, la Repubblica, and La Stampa. "Local and regional papers are particularly vital in Italy."

Books

Radio

Television

See also 
 Cinema of Italy
 Internet in Italy
 Telecommunications in Italy
 Italian literature
 Censorship in Italy
 Open access in Italy to scholarly communication

References

Bibliography

External links
 

 
Italy
Italy